Aspidophoroides is a genus of poachers native to the northern Pacific and Atlantic oceans.

Species
There are currently two recognized species in this genus:
 Aspidophoroides monopterygius (Bloch, 1786) (Alligatorfish)
 Aspidophoroides olrikii Lütken, 1877 (Arctic alligatorfish)

References

Anoplagoninae
Taxa named by Bernard Germain de Lacépède